"It's Only Love" is a song performed by Donna Summer from her album Crayons. The song was released as the album's third single on June 6, 2008, by Burgundy Records. It was written by Summer, Sebastian Morton and Al Kasha and produced by Kasha. The song appears on international copies of the album and a "Circuit City 14 Track exclusive edition" sold briefly in Circuit City Stores. It was released exclusively as a download only single for the U.S. iTunes Store.

2007 songs
2008 singles
Donna Summer songs
Songs written by Donna Summer
Songs written by Al Kasha
Song recordings produced by Sebastian Arocha Morton
American dance-pop songs
American house music songs
Sony Music singles